This is a list of countries that have participated in the Miss Universe pageant (until 2021 edition).

Entrants 1952–present

Replaced pageants
The following list consists of the delegations that have acquired the national Miss Universe franchise and replaced a former national pageant. Some of the former organizations still remain active for other purposes.

Inactive entrants

Former entities

Geographical Region

Regional organization

Territories
China

Denmark

France

Japan

Netherlands

New Zealand

South Africa

United Kingdom

United States

Others
The following list consists of countries and territories that have not sent a delegate to the pageant since 2019, or no longer holds the Miss Universe franchise, but participated at least once in the past:

Unsuccessful attempts to participate
The list does not include withdrawals for personal reasons.

References

External links 
 Official Miss Universe website

 
Miss Universe